The 2022–23 season is the 128th in the history of Fortuna Düsseldorf and their third consecutive season in the second division. The club will participate in the 2. Bundesliga and the DFB-Pokal.

Players

Second team

Out on loan

Pre-season and friendlies

Competitions

Overall record

2. Bundesliga

League table

Results summary

Results by round

Matches 
The league fixtures were announced on 17 June 2022.

DFB-Pokal

References

Fortuna Düsseldorf seasons
Fortuna Düsseldorf